Orlovka is a rural locality (a village) in Kysylsky Selsoviet, Alsheyevsky District, Bashkortostan, Russia. The population was 51 as of 2010. There is 1 street.

Geography 
Orlovka is located 14 km south of Rayevsky (the district's administrative centre) by road.

References 

Rural localities in Alsheyevsky District